Erhard is a male German given name and surname, and may refer to:

People
Erhard of Regensburg, bishop of Regensburg in the 7th century
Erhard Altdorfer (c. 1480–1561), German Early Renaissance printmaker, painter and architect
Erhard Arnold Julius Dehio (1855–1940), Baltic German merchant and politician, former mayor of Tallinn (1918)
Erhard Etzlaub (c. 1455 or 1465 – 1532), astronomer, geodesist, cartographer, instrument maker and physician
Erhard Hegenwald, 16th century writer of the Reformation
Erhard Wunderlich (1956–2012), German handball player
Guido Erhard (1969–2002), German footballer
Ludwig Erhard (1897–1977), Chancellor of West Germany
Werner Erhard (born 1935), American author and founder of est
Erhard Seminars Training, or est

Fictional characters
Erhard Muller, the real name of CR-SO1 in Trauma Team

See also
Erhard, Minnesota, a small city in the United States
St. Erhard (brewery), a German brewery
Erhart, another given name and surname
Erhardt

German masculine given names
German-language surnames
Surnames from given names